Chaetostoma platyrhynchus is a species of catfish in the family Loricariidae. It is native to South America, where it occurs in the Caquetá River basin in Colombia. The species reaches 9.5 cm (3.7 inches) in total length. The species is known to be of disputed classification and spelling.

Classification dispute 
This species was originally described as a species of Hemiancistrus by Henry Weed Fowler in 1943, although it was subsequently moved to Peckoltia by Isaäc J. H. Isbrücker in 1980, and later moved to Cordylancistrus in 1996 by W. E. Burgess and L. Finley. In 2004, Jonathan W. Armbruster of Auburn University reclassified the species as a member of Chaetostoma, although FishBase and ITIS both refer to it as Cordylancistrus platyrhynchus, and neither source lists either of Armbruster's names (Chaetostoma platyrhynchus and C. platyrhyncha) for the species as a synonym.

Spelling dispute 
In his 2004 reclassification, Armbruster used platyrhyncha and platyrhynchus interchangeably when referring to the species. In 2008, Armbruster referred to the species as C. platyrhynchus rather than C. platyrhyncha, which became the standard spelling. Armbruster and Milton Tan referred to the species as C. platyrhyncha in their 2012 description of Cordylancistrus santarosensis (which has subsequently been reclassified as Transancistrus santarosensis), furthering the confusion surrounding the correct spelling of the name.

In 2016, Gustavo A. Ballen of the University of London and Alexander Urbano-Bonilla and Javier A. Maldonado-Ocampo of the Pontifical Xavierian University ruled that changing the specific epithet to platyrhyncha or platyrhynchum to comply with the ICZN's name gender guidelines was not in this case justified and that the species should be referred to as Chaetostoma platyrhynchus.

References 

platyrhynchus
Fish described in 1943
Fish of Colombia